Catherine Healy may refer to:

 Catherine Healy (activist), founder of the New Zealand Prostitutes' Collective
 Catherine Healy (chef) (died 1993), Michelin starred head chef of restaurant Dunderry Lodge in Ireland